Djambala is the main town of Djambala District and the Plateaux Region of the Republic of Congo.  It lies north of Brazzaville and lies near the Léfini Faunal Reserve.

Climate 
Djambala has a tropical savanna climate (Köppen Aw), bordering on a tropical monsoon climate (Am). It features a short dry season from June to August due to the influence of the Benguela Current reaching furthest north, and a lengthy wet season for the remaining nine months of the year. Although temperatures are somewhat reduced by the city’s moderately high altitude, conditions are very warm and humid throughout the year even in the dry season.

Transport 

In April 2007, a deal was signed with a Korean consortium to build a railway mainly for timber traffic from the main port to Djambala.

Djambala is also served by Djambala Airport.

See also 

 Railway stations in Congo

References 

Plateaux Department (Republic of the Congo)
Populated places in the Republic of the Congo